The Al safa is the residential and recreational development under construction in the locality of Al Safa Dubai, UAE.The project was announced by Dubai Municipality to build a  Al safa area which will endow residential communities and recreational centres.

The whole development includes traditional aflaj (water channel system), and a big lake surrounded by restaurants, office and residential complexes.

Apart from it the development also includes the Pedestrian Promenade, which will be constructed along an  stretch of a Dubai Creek extension. The promenade will serve as centre point of commercial and recreational attraction.

The construction work on the infrastructure development of the area, between Al Wasl and Sheikh Zayed Road is expected to begin soon.

References
UAEpropertytrends.com

Financial districts in the United Arab Emirates
Buildings and structures under construction in Dubai